Ozias Midwinter may refer to:

 Ozias Midwinter, a character in Armadale
 Ozias Midwinter, a pen-name of Lafcadio Hearn